Horace Jason Davies (17 July 1903 – 4 June 1971) was a member of the Queensland Legislative Assembly.

Biography
Davies was born in Gympie, Queensland, the son of John Jason Davies and his wife Ellen Christiana (née Christensen). He was educated at Woongarra State School and, except for a two-year period when he was an exchange teacher with the London County Council between 1935–1937, for his entire working life taught at schools across Queensland.

On 13 November 1935 he married Ruby Ellis and together had one daughter. Davies died of an enlarged heart in June 1971 and was cremated at the Mt Thompson Crematorium.

Public career
When David Farrell the member for Maryborough in the Queensland Legislative Assembly died in 1953, Davies won the by-election held in November of that year to find a replacement. Neither the Liberal Party nor the Country Party contested the by-election and Davies easily defeated his lone opponent, Ralph Stafford, an alderman on the Maryborough City Council who stood as an independent.

Davies went on to represent the electorate until his own death in 1971. During his time in parliament he was the Opposition Whip from 1960 until his death and also the Shadow Minister for Education. He was a musician of wide accomplishment and was conductor of the Maryborough Choral Society. He was also President of the Wide Bay National Fitness Club and patron and founder of the Maryborough and Hervey Bay Blue Nursing Service.

References

Members of the Queensland Legislative Assembly
1903 births
1971 deaths
Australian Labor Party members of the Parliament of Queensland
20th-century Australian politicians